Latif Kapadia (27 March 1934 – 29 March 2002) was a Pakistani stage and television actor.

Career 
Born on 27 March 1934 in Nashik, a city in the Maharashtra state of British India of Gujarati descent. His parents originated from Abrama village near Navsari, Gujarat. Latif Kapadia migrated to Karachi at the age of 13 with his family and started his career as a stage actor. In 1953, Kapadia began his acting career.

A few years later, Kapadia started acting with the Avant-Garde Arts Theatre. He then expanded to television plays with Pakistan Television in 1967. 
During his television career, Kapadia appeared in the following plays: 
 Baarish
 Barzakh
 Karawaan
 Fifty Fifty 
 Rozi
 Gurez
 Chand Grehan
 Nadan Nadia
 Shikastay Arzoo

For his film appearances, Kapadia was in the 1998 movie Very Good Dunya, Very Bad Log He was fond of singing also and used to sing the songs of his friend, Ahmed Rushdi, who was a well known singer of Pakistan film industry. Kapadia received the Pride of Performance in 2001.

Death
On 29 March 29 2002, Kapadia died from cardio-respiratory arrest, two days after his 68th birthday at age 68. Fellow actor Moin Akhter had earlier took him to the Liaquat National Hospital for treatment. He was discharged after minor treatment. He later died at his home. Kapadia was married and had five children. He was buried in Karachi at Mewa Shah Graveyard.

See also 
 Pakistan Television Corporation
 List of Lollywood actors

References

External links
 

1934 births
2002 deaths
Pakistani male television actors
Pakistani male stage actors
Pakistani male film actors
Recipients of the Pride of Performance
Pakistani Muslims
People from Nashik
Male actors from Karachi
20th-century Pakistani male actors
Pakistani people of Gujarati descent
Khoja Ismailism